Blue Boys were a Danish vocal quartet of the 1960s. Their best known songs included : "Ud på flisen Karoline" (1958), "Oppe på bjerget" (1954), "En skraldemand han tar skraldet, Charlie Brown" (1959), "Tammy, Hvem har lånt min gamle hat" (1958) and "Falleri Fallera".

References

Danish musical groups